The 1915 Haskell Indians football team was an American football team that represented the Haskell Indian Institute (now known as Haskell Indian Nations University) as an independent during the 1915 college football season. In its fifth and final season under head coach A. R. Kennedy, Haskell compiled a 5–5 record and was outscored by a total of 150 to 75. Its victories included a game Oklahoma A&M; its losses included games against Illinois, Notre Dame, Texas A&M, and Chicago.

Schedule

References

Haskell
Haskell Indian Nations Fighting Indians football seasons
Haskell Indians football